Weidner Mill is a historic grist mill complex located on Manatawny Creek in Amity Township, Berks County, Pennsylvania.  The complex consists of the -story stone-and-brick banked mill (1855); -story, stucco-over-stone farmhouse (c. 1840); -story, stucco-over-stone, combined smokehouse and spring house (c. 1820); -story, stucco-over-stone tenant house (c. 1820); stucco-over-stone bank barn (c. 1850); and the millrace and dam. The mill ceased operation in the 1940s. The mill was built as part of a working farm.

It was listed on the National Register of Historic Places in 1990.

References

Grinding mills in Berks County, Pennsylvania
Grinding mills on the National Register of Historic Places in Pennsylvania
Industrial buildings completed in 1855
Houses in Berks County, Pennsylvania
National Register of Historic Places in Berks County, Pennsylvania